Sebastián Vázquez (born November 4, 1980 in San Ramón, Uruguay) is an Uruguayan retired football midfielder.

Club career
Vázquez began his career in 2000 with Rentistas, in 2003 he moved to Liverpool de Montevideo and in 2005 he moved to Nacional where he was part of the squad that won back to back league championships.

In 2007 Vázquez joined reigning Argentine champions Estudiantes de la Plata. On August 28, 2007 he signed with FC Chornomorets Odessa. In February 2009 he returned to Liverpool de Montevideo on loan. In the summer of 2009 he returned to Chornomorets Odessa, where he played for half season until moving to Beitar Jerusalem.
In August 2010 he signed with Danubio, which plays in the Primera División Uruguaya.

Vázquez moved to Hangzhou Greentown on a two years loan deal in January 2011.

In February 2012, he signed a six-month deal with Cerro Largo FC.

Titles

On July 3, 2012 he moved to Atlético Junior of Barranquilla, Colombia

Notes

References

External links
Interview with Vázquez on FC Chornomorets official site 
Listed at Liverpool website as Rodrigo Vazquez 

1980 births
Living people
People from Canelones Department
Uruguayan footballers
Uruguayan expatriate footballers
Association football midfielders
C.A. Rentistas players
Liverpool F.C. (Montevideo) players
Club Nacional de Football players
Estudiantes de La Plata footballers
FC Chornomorets Odesa players
Beitar Jerusalem F.C. players
Danubio F.C. players
Zhejiang Professional F.C. players
Peñarol players
Cerro Largo F.C. players
Club Sol de América footballers
Israeli Premier League players
Paraguayan Primera División players
Uruguayan Primera División players
Uruguayan Segunda División players
Argentine Primera División players
Ukrainian Premier League players
Chinese Super League players
Expatriate footballers in Argentina
Expatriate footballers in Israel
Expatriate footballers in Ukraine
Expatriate footballers in China
Expatriate footballers in Paraguay
Uruguayan expatriate sportspeople in Argentina
Uruguayan expatriate sportspeople in Israel
Uruguayan expatriate sportspeople in Ukraine
Uruguayan expatriate sportspeople in China
Uruguayan expatriate sportspeople in Paraguay